Alyssum pulvinare is a species of madwort, a flowering plant in the family Brassicaceae. A perennial herbaceous plant native to the Balkans, it grows on rocky places, rock ledges and dry grassy slopes, forming tufts about 6–15cm high. It flowers in May and June.

Alyssum thracicum  is treated as a synonym by most, though not all, sources. Alyssum mildeanum  is also commonly included as a synonym, although in some sources it is instead assigned to  A. stribrnyi.

References 

pulvinare
Flora of Southeastern Europe
Taxa named by Josef Velenovský
Plants described in 1889